Intex Technologies, is an Indian  multinational electronics manufacturing services company that manufactures smartphones, consumer electronics, and other accessories. It also provides consumer electronic products such as MP3 players, DVD players, headphones, home theater systems, and speakers. It was founded in 1996 and is headquartered in New Delhi, India.

History 
The company was established in 1996 at New Delhi by Narendra Bansal. Currently, Keshav Bansal, son of Narendra Bansal, is the active director of the company.

In 2012, from an IT product company, Intex Technologies expanded its consumer durables portfolio with the entry in LED TVs business. The LED TVs business has seen a growth of over 150% and the company has a 6% share in LED TVs and 3% share in washing machines nationally.

IPL Team 
The company also owned an IPL franchise called Gujarat Lions in 2016 and 2017.

References

External links 

 Official website

Companies based in New Delhi
Consumer electronics brands
Electronics companies of India
Indian brands
MeeGo
Mobile phone companies of India
Mobile phone manufacturers
Manufacturing companies established in 1996
Indian Premier League franchise owners
www.intex.in